Kelly David McCullough (born 1967) is a contemporary American author of fantasy and science fiction novels living in Wisconsin. His critically acclaimed WebMage was released in 2006, followed by Cybermancy in 2007, CodeSpell in 2008, MythOS in 2009, and Spellcrash in 2010, and other novels since, including the young adult novel School for Sidekicks. Some of his 20 published short stories include The Uncola, When Jabberwocks Attack, and The Totally Secret Origin of Foxman: Excerpts from an EPIC Autobiography, a Tor.Com original; he also has written a number of poems, including The Bees: An Edgar Allan Pooh Poem. His non-fiction work includes an illustrated collection that is part of a robust middle school physical science curriculum that was funded by the National Science Foundation and has been adopted by several state boards of education, the Interactions in Physical Science  curriculum.

Before succeeding as a published author, McCullough acted in the Minnesota Renaissance Festival, the Colorado Renaissance Festival, and the Arizona Renaissance Festival. He lives with his wife, Laura, and a number of cats.

Awards include the 2000 "Writers of the Future" winner, an international competition begun by L. Ron Hubbard.

In 2008, he donated his archive to the department of Rare Books and Special Collections at Northern Illinois University.

Bibliography

Adult Novels

Fallen Blade series 

 Broken Blade
 Bared Blade
 Crossed Blades
 Blade Reforged
 Drawn Blades
 Darkened Blades

Webmage series 

 WebMage
 Cybermancy
 Codespell
 MythOS
 Spellcrash

Middle-Grade Novels

Magic, Madness, and Mischief series 

 Magic, Madness, and Mischief
 Spirits, Spells, and Snark

Academy of Metahuman Operatives 

 School for Sidekicks
 "The Totally Secret Origin of Foxman: Excerpts from an EPIC Autobiography" (short story)

References

External links
The Kelly McCullough Papers at Northern Illinois University

Kelly's website

21st-century American novelists
American fantasy writers
American male novelists
American science fiction writers
American science writers
Living people
1967 births
21st-century American male writers
21st-century American non-fiction writers
American male non-fiction writers